The JAC Refine A60 (瑞风A60) is an executive car made by the Chinese automaker JAC. The Refine A60 is the largest sedan of the JAC Refine series, and was seen as the series' flagship.

JAC Refine A6 concept (2014)
The Refine A6 (瑞风A6) concept was unveiled in 2014 Beijing Auto Show. The Refine A6 concept is essentially the pre-production concept previewing the Refine A60. The front grille and headlights design of the A60 concept was being inspired by the Audi A6.

JAC Refine A60 (2016)
JAC Refine A60 (瑞风A60) was unveiled 2015 Shanghai Auto Show, followed by 2015 Guangzhou Auto Show.

China model was set to go on sale in Q1 2016, but was delayed to November 2016. Early model included 1.5 turbo (rated 174hp/251Nm) engine, with 2.0 turbo rated (190hp/280Nm) model available later. Prices of the Refine A60 ranges from 139,500 yuan to 179,500 yuan.

Engines and transmission
There were two engines available, including a 1.5 liter turbocharged petrol engine producing 174hp and 251nm, and a 2.0 liter turbo petrol engine producing 190hp and 280nm. Both engines was mated to either a six-speed manual transmission or a six-speed DCT.

JAC iEVA60 
JAC iEVA60 (江淮iEVA60) is based on the Refine A60 body with additional batteries and an electric motor. According to JAC official numbers, the maximum range of the iEVA60 is 405 to 510 kilometers. The prototype vehicle was unveiled in 2018 Guangzhou Auto Show.

References

External links
JAC Motors A60 page: English, Chinese

Refine A60
Executive cars
Front-wheel-drive vehicles
Mid-size cars
Sedans
Cars introduced in 2015